Bhagalpur sari is an silk sari made in Bhagalpur, India. More than a century old, Tussar silk weaving industry in Bhagalpur has about 30,000 handloom weavers working on some 25,000 handlooms. The total value of annual trade is around Rs. 100 crores, about half of which comes from exports.

History
The history of making Bhagalpuri silk sarees started 200 years by highly skilled craftsmen. The unique dyeing technique of these Bhagalpuri silk sarees sets them apart from the art silk sarees. Nowadays, instead of vegetable dyes, acid dyes are used because they are suitable for silk and easily available on the market.

See also
Ilkal saree
Mysore silk
Navalgund Durries

References

Saris
Bhagalpur district
Culture of Bihar
Geographical indications in Bihar